United Nations Security Council Resolution 51, adopted on June 3, 1948, reaffirmed previous Council resolutions on the India–Pakistan conflict, directed the Commission established in United Nations Security Council Resolution 39 to move to the areas of dispute and accomplish the duties assigned to it in United Nations Security Council Resolution 47 as soon as possible.  The resolution also instructed the Commission to address a letter that was sent to the Council by the Foreign Minister of Pakistan.

The resolution was adopted by eight votes; the Republic of China, Ukrainian SSR and Soviet Union abstained.

See also
List of United Nations Security Council Resolutions 1 to 100 (1946–1953)

References
Text of the Resolution at undocs.org

External links
 

 0051
 0051
June 1948 events